Moshe Carmel (17 January 1911 – 14 August 2003) was an Israeli soldier and politician who  served as Minister of Transportation for eight years.

Background
Born in Mińsk Mazowiecki in the Russian Empire (today in Poland), Carmel emigrated to Mandate Palestine in 1924 when he was 13 years old. He was a founding member of kibbutz Na'an, and was active in the HaNoar HaOved VeHaLomed youth movement. Between 1939 and 1941 he was imprisoned by the British authorities. During the 1948 Arab–Israeli war, he was commander of the Carmeli Brigade, which was especially known for Operation Hiram.

He was elected to the third Knesset in 1955 as a member of Ahdut HaAvoda and was appointed Minister of Transportation. On 28 September 1956  he flew to Paris with Moshe Dayan, Shimon Peres and Golda Meir where they had meetings with French Foreign Minister Christian Pineau. The purpose of the meetings was 'to clarify ... the possibilities of joint action against Egypt'.

On 29 October 1957 he suffered a broken arm after a 'Mills grenade' was thrown into the debating chamber of the Knesset. David Ben-Gurion and Golda Meir were also injured. The attack was carried out by Moshe Dwek, whose motives were attributed to a dispute with the Jewish Agency, though he was also described as 'mentally unbalanced'. He retained his seat in the 1959 and 1961 elections, and was reappointed Minister of Transportation towards the end of the fifth Knesset in 1965. When Ahdut HaAvoda merged with Mapai to form the Alignment, Carmel joined the new party and retained his ministerial post in the sixth Knesset.

Carmel remained a Knesset member until 1977, and published two books; Northern Campaigns (1949) and Between the Walls (1965). He died in 2003 at the age of 92.

References

External links

Obituary The Guardian

1911 births
2003 deaths
20th-century Israeli military personnel
20th-century Israeli non-fiction writers
Ahdut HaAvoda politicians
Alignment (Israel) politicians
Burials at Kiryat Shaul Cemetery
Hebrew-language writers
Israeli Jews
Israeli Labor Party politicians
Israeli officers
Jewish Israeli politicians
Jewish military personnel
Jews in Mandatory Palestine
Kibbutzniks
Members of the 3rd Knesset (1955–1959)
Members of the 4th Knesset (1959–1961)
Members of the 5th Knesset (1961–1965)
Members of the 6th Knesset (1965–1969)
Members of the 7th Knesset (1969–1974)
Members of the 8th Knesset (1974–1977)
Ministers of Transport of Israel
People from Mińsk Mazowiecki
Polish emigrants to Israel
Jews from the Russian Empire